South Carolina Highway 211 (SC 211) is a  primary state highway in the U.S. state of South Carolina. The highway serves the rural areas of southern Cherokee and western York counties.

Route description
SC 211 begins at an intersection with SC 150, north of Pacolet in Cherokee County, going easterly along Asbury Road to Asbury, where it connects with SC 18. Splitting from SC 18 onto Gowdeysville Road, it connects with SC 105 in Saratt.  Solo again, when it splits from SC 105 with Hickory Grove Road, it crosses the Broad River and into York County. At Hickory Grove, it connects briefly with SC 97, before continuing southeasterly to Sharon, where it ends at an intersection with SC 49.

History
SC 211 was established by 1942 as a renumbering of part of SC 105, from SC 105 to SC 5 in Hickory Grove. In 1951–52, SC 211 was extended east to its current eastern terminus with SC 91 in Sharon, replacing part of SC 5. In 1955–56, SC 211 was extended west to its current western terminus with SC 18 (later becoming SC 150), replacing SC 98. This is the third and current version of SC 211.

The first SC 211 existed between 1925 and 1928, traveling between SC 21 in Travelers Rest, to the North Carolina state line at Caesars Head. It was renumbered as SC 284, later becoming part of US 276.

The second SC 211 existed between 1928 and 1942, initially traveling between US 21 in Fort Mill, and SC 26 in Indian Land. In 1939 it was extended to the North Carolina state line. In 1941 or 1942, it was renumbered to SC 160.

South Carolina Highway 73

South Carolina Highway 73 (SC 73) was a state highway that was established about 1926 on a path from SC 7 (now U.S. Route 21 Business) in Fort Mill to SC 26 (now US 521) in Indian Land. In 1928, this was decommissioned and redesignated as the second SC 211. Today, this highway is part of SC 160.

Major intersections

See also

References

External links

 
 Mapmikey's South Carolina Highways Page: SC 211

211
Transportation in Cherokee County, South Carolina
Transportation in York County, South Carolina